Jayson Uribe (born March 27, 1999 in Bellevue, Washington) is an American motorcycle racer from Napa Valley, California.

Early career 
Jayson began his motorcycle racing career at age 4 aboard a Honda 50. He advanced to a two stroke Kawasaki KX65 at age 5 and began racing motocross competitively in the Northern California region. At age 7, Uribe expanded his racing interest to Supermoto on his KX65 Kawasaki with Supermoto USA and excelled in his division. Uribe raced and won in several championships aboard his Honda big wheel CRF150R and CRF250R over the next 5 years. By the age of 12 he had taken his Honda CRF250R to the top step of the SRC National Lites Champion while riding for Mammoth Motorsports. (Supermoto Riders Coalition Facebook Page)

In 2009, Uribe began his road racing career aboard a 2004 production Honda RS125 two-stroke GP machine. He is the second-youngest licensed racer in AFM history. Uribe raced at a club level in WERA and AFM for three years; however due to his young age several racetracks would not allow him to ride on their circuit citing insurance issues, thus making a championship win nearly impossible. In 2011 he was the WERA West Novice Champion in the F2 class. In 2012 and 2013 he was one of six Americans invited to the Redbull Rookies tryouts in Spain.

Between the years of 2013-2017, Jayson represented the USA internationally in the following championships:
2013: British Superbike Motul Motostar Championship - Monster Energy Motostar Championship - Rock and Sons Racing (2009 Honda RS125)
2014: British Superbike Motul Motostar Championship - Motul Motostar Championship - Fireplace Warehouse Racing (2012 Luyton Honda Moto3)
2015: French Superbike Championship - Pirelli 600 Cup - Race Experience Junior (2015 Honda CBR600RR)
2016: FIM CEV Moto2 European Championship - Moto2 - AGR Racing (2015 Honda CBR600RR with Kalex chassis)
2017: FIM CEV Moto2 European Championship - Moto2 - AGR Racing (2016 Honda CBR600RR with Kalex chassis)

In 2018, Jayson returned to his native home of California to begin his MotoAmerica Superbike Championship bid with Genuine Broaster ChickenHonda  with Danny Walker as the principle of the team.  On June 24, 2018, with no experience on the newly assembled 2017 Honda CBR1000rr sp2, Jayson made his Superbike debut at Weather Tech Laguna Seca Raceway where he finished 11th place out of a field of 19. Jayson Uribe Superbike press release by Michael Hill Productions

International career 
Uribe's first international championship was in 2013 in the British Superbike Championship in the Monster Energy Motostar class.  Jayson and his mother lived in Nottingham, UK for the season while his father stayed in Napa Valley to continue the family electrical business.  Jayson raced under the Rock and Sons Racing banner with Ian Emberton as his chief mechanic. Jayson placed 11th overall in the Championship that year with his strongest race finish being 7th at Silverstone in 2013.  Jayson was the only rider to finish every race in points contention; and he still holds the BSB record today with 19 consecutive finishes in points contention.  

Jayson continued on in England for another year before a team from France, headed by the famous French endurance champion, Sebastien Gimbert, asked him to join his "Race Experience Junior" team and ride alongside two other French racers in the Pirelli 600 Cup in the French Superbike Championship. During the 2015 season, Jayson achieved 5 podium finishes and 1 win.  With his win at Ledenon, Jayson became the first American rider to ever win a race in FSBK history.

International championship standings 
 2013  Monster Energy Motostar Championship; Honda RS125 - 11th overall, best finish 7th (Rock and Sons Racing)
 2014  Motul Moto3 Championship; Honda Moto3 - 3rd overall; best finish 2nd (Fireplace Warehouse Racing)
 2015  French Superbike 600 Pirelli Cup; Honda CBR600RR - 5th overall, best finish 1st  -  Lap record for stock 600 at Circuit de Ledenon, first international win (Race Experience Junior)
 2016  FIM CEV Moto2 European Championship - 2015 Kalex - 11th overall, best finish 7th (AGR Racing) 2016 FIM CEV Moto2 Results
 2017  FIM CEV Moto2 European Championship - 2016 Kalex - 11th overall, best finish 8th (AGR Racing) 2017 FIM CEV Moto2 Results

manager is Donnie Graves of NCompass International of Beverly Hills, Ca. Together with his publicist, Michael Hill (Michael Hill Productions), Jayson has a solid team working together to maximize his public and social media presence for his team and sponsors.

Jayson works three jobs to help cover his racing expenses; he is an electrical apprentice at Rock and Sons, Inc.; a driving instructor and coach at the Allen Burg Racing School and an instructor with Danny Walker's American Supercamp, motorcycle technique school. Jayson is an accomplished journalist as well and is the owner of his own media company, Full Throttle Media, in Angwin, California.  Jayson has been published in multiple international magazines and wrote a monthly column for Roadracing World called "Chasing the Dream" for 3 years. Beginning in 2015, he began a new relationship with Bonnier Motorsports Group, out of New York, as one of their International Field Correspondents responsible for covering the motorcycle racing scene in Europe.

References

Living people
1999 births
American motorcycle racers
Superbike World Championship riders